Rosser may refer to:


People
 Rosser (surname)
 Rosser Evans (1867–?), Welsh rugby union player
 Rosser Reeves (1910–1984), American advertising executive and pioneer of television advertising

Places
 Rural Municipality of Rosser, Manitoba, Canada
 Rosser, Texas, United States, a village
 Rosser Ridge, Queen Elizabeth Land, Antarctica

Other uses
 Rosser International, an architectural firm

See also
 Prosser (disambiguation)

English-language masculine given names